Radio stations and television channels in Duluth, Minnesota. Most of the AM, FM and TV transmitters are located on the hills to the north of the city.

AM radio

FM radio

Television
Duluth has experienced firsthand the consequences of media consolidation. On March 8, 2005 the sale of Duluth's CBS affiliate was announced to Malara Broadcast Group of Sarasota, Florida. The group agreed to pay Granite Broadcasting Group, which already runs the NBC affiliate KBJR, to take over the operations for KDLH. The majority of the news staff of KDLH was dismissed.

Duluth